The Diamond Hill Historic District is a national historic district located in Lynchburg, Virginia. The district is irregularly shaped and approximately 14 blocks in area. It is wedged between the Lynchburg Expressway (Rt. 29) to the south and the city's central commercial core to the north.  Most houses on Diamond Hill were erected during the late 19th and early 20th centuries and range from speculative houses to  upper-middle-class residences.  The more formidable residences line Washington and Clay streets and include a high number of Georgian Revival and Colonial Revival houses.  Located in the district is the separately listed Diamond Hill Baptist Church.

It was listed on the National Register of Historic Places in 1979 and expanded in 1983.

Gallery

References

External links
 Diamond Hill Historic District Facebook Page
 Diamond Hill Historic Society Web Page

Historic districts in Lynchburg, Virginia
Colonial Revival architecture in Virginia
Georgian Revival architecture in Virginia
Victorian architecture in Virginia
Buildings and structures in Lynchburg, Virginia
National Register of Historic Places in Lynchburg, Virginia
Historic districts on the National Register of Historic Places in Virginia